Peter Jon de Vos (December 24, 1938 – June 9, 2008) was an American  ambassador to Costa Rica, Guinea-Bissau, Liberia, Mozambique and Tanzania.

References

External links

1938 births
2008 deaths
Ambassadors of the United States to Costa Rica
Ambassadors of the United States to Guinea-Bissau
Ambassadors of the United States to Liberia
Ambassadors of the United States to Mozambique
Ambassadors of the United States to Cape Verde
United States Foreign Service personnel
20th-century American diplomats